USS California (SP-647) – later known as USS SP-647 – was originally a motorboat used by the San Francisco Bar Pilots Association as a pilot boat. She was leased by the Navy, and outfitted as an armed section patrol craft, assigned to patrol and protect San Francisco harbor. At war's end, she was returned to the pilot's association.

A California pilot boat 

California, a 58' 2" motorboat, was built in 1910 at San Francisco, California, for local employment as a pilot boat. She was leased from the San Francisco Bar Pilot's Association and commissioned in the Navy as USS California (SP-647) on 28 April 1917.

World War I service 

The fourth ship to be so named by the U.S. Navy, California (No. 647), served Section Patrol duties during the war. Later renamed USS SP-647, the motor boat performed harbor patrol duties and acted as guard boat for Pier 29 at San Francisco until 23 November 1918

Decommissioning 

California (No. 647) was returned to the San Francisco Bar Pilot's Association on 23 November 1918.

Additional photos 

The San Francisco Maritime Museum, located in the San Francisco Maritime National Historical Park, holds additional photographs of the pilot boat California in its Livingston Collection.

See also 

 California (schooner) (San Francisco Bar Pilots Association pilot boat 1931–1972)

References 
  
 California (Motor Boat, 1910). Served as USS California (SP-647) and USS SP-647 in 1917–1918
 NavSource Online: SP-647 – ex-California

External links 
 San Francisco Bar Pilots Association Official Website

World War I patrol vessels of the United States
Patrol vessels of the United States Navy
Ships built in San Francisco
1910 ships